New Orleans' city council elections were held on April 22, 2006, and runoff elections were held on May 20, 2006.

At-Large Council Spots

District A

District B

District C

District D

District E

See also
 New Orleans City Council
 2006 New Orleans mayoral election

References

New Orleans city council

21st century in New Orleans
Government of New Orleans
2006 Louisiana elections
Local elections in Louisiana
City council elections in the United States